André Leipold (born 12 November 2001) is a German professional footballer who plays as a forward for Würzburger Kickers on loan from Darmstadt 98.

Club career
Leipold is a youth product of TV Altötting, Red Bull Salzburg, Bayern Munich, Unterhaching, DFI Bad Aibling, and Wacker Burghausen. A street footballer in his youth, he began his senior career with Wacker Burghausen in the Regionalliga, where he scored 9 goals in 23 games. This earned him a transfer to Darmstadt 98 in January 2022, where he signed a professional contract until 2025. He made his professional debut with Darmstadt as a 60th minute substitute in a 3–1 tie with 1. FC Nürnberg in the 2. Bundesliga on 9 April 2022, where he scored an own goal in extra time.

On 10 January 2023, Leipold was loaned by Würzburger Kickers.

References

External links
 
 Bundesliga Profile

2001 births
Living people
People from Altötting
German footballers
Association football forwards
2. Bundesliga players
Regionalliga players
SV Wacker Burghausen players
SV Darmstadt 98 players
Würzburger Kickers players
German expatriate footballers
German expatriate sportspeople in Austria
Expatriate footballers in Austria